Santa Maria dei Miracoli may refer to:

 Santa Maria dei Miracoli, Brescia, Brescia
 Santa Maria dei Miracoli presso San Celso, Milan
 Santa Maria dei Miracoli, Naples
 Santa Maria dei Miracoli, Ragusa
 Santa Maria dei Miracoli and Santa Maria in Montesanto, Rome
 Santa Maria dei Miracoli, Venice